Sheikh Mosharraf Hossain was a Bengali politician and cousin of Sheikh Lutfar Rahman, father of Sheikh Mujibur Rahman and grandfather of Prime Minister Sheikh Hasina. He was a Member of the East Pakistan Legislative Assembly.Sheikh Mosharraf Hossain had two brothers, Sheikh Delwar Hossain Dilu (freedom fighter ) and businessman, Sheikh Mosharraf Hossain was a Bengali politician and cousin of Sheikh Lutfar Rahman, father of Sheikh Mujibur Rahman and grandfather of Prime Minister Sheikh Hasina. He was a member of the East Pakistan Legislative Council.

Career 
Hossain was given the title of Khan Bahadur by the British Government.

Hossain was a member of the East Pakistan Legislative Assembly in 1962. Khan Sahib Sheikh Musharraf Hossain School and College was established in Tungipara, Gopalganj District in his name. His son, Sheikh Kabir Hossain, was the founding chairperson of the Khan Sahib Sheikh Musharraf Hossain School and College.

Personal life 
Hossain's nephew, Sheikh Mujibur Rahman, is the founding father of Bangladesh. He had a daughter, Hamida Khanom Ranu, and a son, Sheikh Kabir Hossain.

References 

Sheikh Mujibur Rahman family
People from Gopalganj District, Bangladesh
Year of birth missing
Year of death missing